The women's super heavyweight (over 70 kg/154 lbs) K-1 category at the W.A.K.O. World Championships 2007 in Belgrade was the heaviest of the female K-1 tournaments.  There were just the four women from three continents (Europe, Asia and Africa) taking part in the competition.  Each of the matches was three rounds of two minutes each and were fought under K-1 rules.   

The tournament winner was Hungarian Zita Zatyko who defeated Moroccan Samira El Haddad in the final to take the gold medal.  Defeated semi finalists Russian Albina Vaskeykina and Syrian Azza Attoura received bronze medals.

Results

See also
List of WAKO Amateur World Championships
List of WAKO Amateur European Championships
List of female kickboxers

References

External links
 WAKO World Association of Kickboxing Organizations Official Site

Kickboxing events at the WAKO World Championships 2007 Belgrade
2007 in kickboxing
Kickboxing in Serbia